Edward Knapp is the name of:

Edward Alan Knapp (1932–2009), American physicist, Director of the National Science Foundation 1982–1984
Edward Knapp-Fisher (1915–2003), Anglican bishop and scholar
Edward F. Knapp State Airport, a Vermont airport
Edward Spring Knapp (1879–1940), member of the American Philatelic Society Hall of Fame
Edward Knapp (cricketer) (1848–1903), English cricketer